"Big 14" is a song by American rappers Trippie Redd and Offset featuring fellow American rapper Moneybagg Yo. It was released on August 5, 2022 and produced by Honorable C.N.O.T.E.

Background
The track was first previewed back in Trippie’s LIFE’S A TRIP tour with Him stating that Lil Uzi Vert was on the song. fast forward three years later in 2021 of March Offset would preview his in a instagram story. a year later Trippie Redd teased the song in May 2022, by posting a video on social media of him listening to the song. then a day after Moneybagg Yo would preview his verse during a Instagram Live.

Composition
The song features "glitchy 808s" and "harrowing piano chords". In the lyrics, the three rappers brag about their wealth while also sending warnings and violent threats toward anyone who opposes them.

Music video
A music video was released alongside the single. Directed by Nolan Riddle, it sees Trippie Redd, Offset and Moneybagg Yo rapping in various locations, such as near abandoned buildings, on rooftops and in front of a private jet.

Charts

References

2022 singles
2022 songs
Trippie Redd songs
Offset (rapper) songs
Moneybagg Yo songs
Songs written by Trippie Redd
Songs written by Offset (rapper)

Gangsta rap songs
Hardcore hip hop songs